The Imperial Laws Application Act 1988 is an important part of New Zealand's uncodified constitution. The Act applies certain enactments of the Parliament of the United Kingdom and its predecessors, rulings of the Judicial Committee of the Privy Council and English common law into New Zealand law.

Background

The 2nd New Zealand Parliament passed the English Laws Act 1858, which affirmed the application of statutes of the Parliament of the United Kingdom and its predecessors to New Zealand law.

Key provisions

The Act provides that after its commencement, no Imperial enactments or subordinate legislation not listed in the Schedules of the Act are part of New Zealand law.

The First and Second Schedules to the Act lists the Imperial Acts which are part of New Zealand law. The Act also provides that the common law of England (including the principles and rules of equity), so far as it was part of the laws of New Zealand immediately before the commencement of the Act, continue to be part of the laws of New Zealand. These Acts include:

Constitutional laws

 A part of Statute of Westminster 1275 (titled Peace of the Church and the Realm Act 1275 in the United Kingdom)
 Magna Carta (only the preamble and Chapter 29 apply)
 Part of the Six Statutes involving due process, including Statute the Fifth (1351) and Liberty of Subject (1354).
 Habeas Corpus Acts of 1640, 1679 and 1816
 Act of Settlement 1701
 Bill of Rights 1688
 Petition of Right 1628

Other laws

 Calendar (New Style) Act 1750
 Wills Act 1837, for persons who die before 1 November 2007.

The Act gives the Governor-General in Council the power to make subordinate legislation under Imperial enactments which are part of the Act.

See also

Constitution of New Zealand
Independence of New Zealand

References

External links
Full text of the Act in the New Zealand legislation database
Auckland District Law Society - Constitutional sources

Statutes of New Zealand
Constitution of New Zealand
1988 in New Zealand law
New Zealand–United Kingdom relations
New Zealand and the Commonwealth of Nations